The 2011–12 Torino F.C. season was the club's 101st season of competitive football and its 12th season in the second division of Italian football, Serie B.

Season overview

Transfers

Summer 2011

In

Out

Winter 2011–12

In

Out

Players

Squad information

Competitions

Serie B

League table

Results summary

Results by round

Matches

Statistics

References

Torino F.C. seasons
Torino